Trần Quang Hiếu (1938-1985) was a Vietnamese artist. He studied in France and in the 1960s was seen as one of the younger artists continuing the traditions of the École des Beaux-Arts de l'Indochine (1925-1945).

References

1938 births
1985 deaths
20th-century Vietnamese painters